Thomas Sydney Hall (8 June 1902 – 23 May 1973) was an Australian rules footballer who played with Geelong in the Victorian Football League (VFL).

Hall was a regular fixture in the Geelong team from 1924 to 1927, before embarking on a stint with Ararat. He played as a forward pocket in Geelong's 1925 premiership side. He returned in the 1930 VFL season but it would be his last year at the club.

References

External links

1902 births
1973 deaths
Australian rules footballers from Victoria (Australia)
Geelong Football Club players
Geelong Football Club Premiership players
Ararat Football Club players
One-time VFL/AFL Premiership players